Bhutan has promised a free COVID-19 vaccination to all of its citizens, both inside and outside the country. It started mass vaccinations on 27 March 2021.

Background 
Bhutan received its first consignment of 150,000 doses of the Astra-Zeneca vaccine in January from the Indian Government. Bhutan became the first country to receive the Astra-Zeneca vaccine. It received its second consignment of 400,000 doses in March through the state-owned airline, Druk Air.

In July 2021 Bhutan started receiving a large number of vaccines: 500,000 doses of the Moderna vaccine from USA, 250,000 doses of the Oxford–AstraZeneca vaccine from Denmark, 100,000 doses of the Oxford–AstraZeneca vaccine from Croatia, Bulgaria and a few other countries, 5,850 doses of the Pfizer–BioNTech vaccine from COVAX and 50,000 doses of the Sinopharm BIBP vaccine from China.

Vaccines on order

COVID-19 history in Bhutan 

Bhutan detected its first COVID-19 case in March 2020. Since then it has had more than 800 COVID-19 positive cases and one reported death.

Eligibility criteria 
The registration for the COVID-19 vaccination started in early March 2021. All of the Bhutanese who were above 15 years of age were eligible to register for the vaccination. However, for safety concerns, only people who were above 18 years of age got the vaccine starting 27 March 2021.

Those who were below this age; those who were pregnant and lactating women and people with severe illnesses were not eligible for the vaccination. However, they will get vaccinated under careful observation.

Deployment 

A national vaccination campaign began on 27 March 2021. Within two weeks, the government of Bhutan said on 9 April 2021 that 470,000 adults had received their first AstraZeneca-Oxford vaccination dose, equivalent to 60% of Bhutan's total population. A large majority of these doses were delivered at 1,200 vaccination centers in the country. Helicopters were also used to distribute vaccines to villages. By 26 April 2021, over 480,000 vaccine doses had been administered, stated the government.

The second dose vaccination campaign began on 20 July 2021. Again, Bhutan administered the second dose to 90% of eligible adults or about 62% of the population in a week, albeit with mostly other vaccines used, such as the Moderna and Sinopharm BIBP vaccines, donated by the United States, China, India and Denmark.

See also 
 Deployment of COVID-19 vaccines

References

External links 
DD India,  India hands over medical supplies to Bhutan in fight against COVID-19, April 28, 2020

Vaccination
Bhutan